The 2023 Shute Shield season, also known as the Charter Hall Shute Shield, or the NSWRU Shute Shield, is the 149th and current season of the semi-professional premier-grade rugby union club competition in the Australian state of New South Wales. With all but one club playing outside of the Sydney area, the competition holds the same number of teams from the previous season, twelve, following difficulties due to the COVID-19 pandemic and the axing of Western Sydney club, Penrith Emus.

The regular season begins on 1 April and will conclude following eighteen rounds, with one bye round, on 5 August. The finals series will kick-off following round eighteen and will hold a total of eight teams: the top four will qualify for the qualifying finals (second chance), with the teams from fifth to eighth advancing to the elimination finals. The Grand Final will be played in early September. The defending champions are Sydney University.

Stadia and personnel

Matches

Ladder

Finals series

Bracket

Notes

References
 

Sports competitions in Sydney
Rugby union competitions in New South Wales
Recurring sporting events established in 1923
1923 establishments in Australia
Sports leagues established in 1923